George Joseph "Mike" Kelly Jr. (born May 10, 1948) is an American politician and businessman who has been a U.S. representative since 2011, currently representing . The district, numbered as the 3rd district from 2011 to 2019, is based in Erie and stretches from the northwest corner of the state to the outer northern suburbs of Pittsburgh.

A member of the Republican Party, Kelly is known for his support of Donald Trump, characterizing the 2019 effort to impeach Trump as akin to Pearl Harbor and filing a lawsuit in state court to invalidate all mail-in ballots cast in Pennsylvania during the 2020 United States presidential election.

On October 22, 2021, it was reported that a congressional ethics watchdog had recommended subpoenaing Kelly for an ethics violation after it was revealed that his wife had purchased stock in an Ohio-based steel company in April 2020 after Kelly had received confidential information about the company. In June 2022, Senator Ron Johnson revealed that Kelly was responsible for providing a slate of fake electors meant to overturn Pennsylvania's electoral votes in the 2020 election. Kelly's office has denied his role in this event.

Education and early career
Kelly was born on May 10, 1948, in Pittsburgh, but has spent most of his life in the outer northern suburb of Butler. He attended the University of Notre Dame.

Automotive business
After college, Kelly worked for his father's Chevrolet/Cadillac car dealership. In 1995, he took over the business, and added Hyundai and KIA to its lineup.

In March 2019, a local TV station discovered that 17 vehicles were for sale on Kelly's Uniontown and Butler lots that were the subject of recall notices but had not been repaired. The station contacted both the businesses and Kelly's office without receiving responses. A month later, a reporter found three of those vehicles with active recalls still for sale. In November 2015, Kelly had spoken on the floor of Congress in support of a bill that would have allowed dealers to loan or rent vehicles despite National Highway Traffic Safety Administration (NHTSA) safety recall notices on them. Kelly had said, "There is not a single person in our business that would ever put one of our owners in a defective car or a car with a recall. But that could happen. That could happen." The bill did not pass.

Kelly's car dealerships received Paycheck Protection Program loans of between $450,000 and $1.05 million to keep staff on the payroll during the coronavirus pandemic. Paycheck Protection Programs loans saved over 160 jobs at Kelly's family-owned dealerships. The loans were designed to keep employees on payroll during the COVID-19. Former Pennsylvania Gov. Tom Wolf deemed automobile dealerships "non-essential" during the pandemic, which forced Kelly's dealerships to close and allowed the dealerships to accept PPP loans.

United States House of Representatives

Committees & Caucuses 
Kelly is a top Republican on the powerful and influential U.S. House of Representatives' Ways & Means Committee. He currently chairs the Subcommittee on Tax, which oversees tax policy, the Internal Revenue Service (IRS), and more. Kelly also sits on the Ways & Means Committee's Subcommittee on Health, which oversees Medicare policy. He previously served as the top Republican on the Committee's Subcommittee on Oversight. Kelly has served on the Ways & Means Committee since 2013.

Kelly belongs to more than 20 caucuses in the U.S. House of Representatives. He chairs or co-chairs several prominent caucuses, including the following: 

 Congressional Cancer Caucus
 Congressional Childhood Cancer Caucus
 House Automotive Caucus
 Friends of Ireland Caucus
 House Small Brewers Caucus
 Congressional Caucus on Korea
 Northern Border Security Caucus

Elections

2010 

Kelly challenged incumbent Representative Kathy Dahlkemper in 2010. He won the election by 10%, largely by running up his margins outside of heavily Democratic Erie.

2012 

Kelly defeated Democrat Missa Eaton 55%–41%. His district had been made slightly friendlier in redistricting. The district was pushed slightly south, absorbing some rural and Republican territory east of Pittsburgh. At the same time, eastern Erie County was drawn into the heavily Republican 5th district. The 3rd and 5th were drawn so that the boundary between the two districts was almost coextensive with the eastern boundary of the city of Erie.

2014 

Kelly defeated Democrat Dan LaVallee of Cranberry Township 60.5%–39.5%.

2016 

Kelly ran unopposed and received 100% of the vote.

2018 

After the Pennsylvania Supreme Court threw out Pennsylvania's original congressional map in February 2018, Kelly's district was renumbered the 16th and made slightly more compact. It regained the eastern portion of Erie County that had been drawn into the 5th. To make up for the increase in population, its southern portion was pushed to the west, leaving Kelly's hometown of Butler just barely inside the district.

PoliticsPA wrote that the new 16th was far less safe for Kelly than the old 3rd, citing a Public Policy Polling poll showing him leading Democratic nominee Ron DiNicola 48% to 43%, below the threshold to be considered safe for a fourth term. Additionally, while Trump carried the old 3rd with 61% of the vote, he would have carried the new 16th with 58% of the vote. Nate Cohn of The New York Times suggested that Kelly would have been in more danger had the 16th absorbed more Democratic-leaning territory northwest of Pittsburgh. Ultimately, much of this territory had been drawn into the reconfigured 17th district (the former 12th district).

Kelly defeated DiNicola 51.6%–47.2%, his first close contest since his initial run for the seat.

2020 

Kelly defeated Democrat Kristy Gnibus of Erie 59.34%–40.66%, an improvement over his performance in 2018. He received 210,088 votes to Gnibus's 143,962. He likely got coattails from Trump, who carried the district with 59% of the vote.

Committee assignments 
 Committee on Ways and Means
Subcommittee on Oversight (Ranking Member)
Subcommittee on Health

Caucus memberships 

 Northeast-Midwest Congressional Coalition 
 Republican Study Committee

Tenure

Conservative Political Action Conference attendance 
In February 2021, Kelly and a dozen other Republican House members skipped votes and enlisted others to vote for them, citing the ongoing COVID-19 pandemic. But he and the other members were actually attending the Conservative Political Action Conference, which was held at the same time as their absences. In response, the Campaign for Accountability, an ethics watchdog group, filed a complaint with the House Committee on Ethics and requested an investigation into Kelly and the other lawmakers.

Debt forgiveness 
During the COVID-19 pandemic, Kelly's auto dealerships received loans from US taxpayers of over $970,000 as part of the Paycheck Protection Program (PPP); the loans were later forgiven. U.S. Representative Katie Porter later introduced legislation that would require all loans under the PPP to be made public. Kelly voted against the TRUTH Act (H.R. 6782), a bill that would have required public disclosure of companies that received funds through the bailout program. As of August 2022, Kelly opposes President Joe Biden's proposal to forgive $10,000 of student debt for individuals making up to $125,000 per year. Kelly's net worth was estimated to be $12.4 million in 2018.

"Deep state" conspiracy theories 
When speaking at a Mercer County Republican Party event in 2017, Kelly advanced the conspiracy theory that former president Barack Obama was running a "shadow government" to undermine President Trump. When asked about these remarks, Kelly said they were meant to be private. After the remarks made national news, Kelly's spokesperson said that Kelly did not believe that Obama "is personally operating a shadow government".

Donald Trump 
Kelly has argued against the release of Trump's tax returns by the House Ways and Means Committee.

In December 2019, Kelly likened Trump's first impeachment to the Attack on Pearl Harbor. He said the date on which Trump was impeached is "another date that will live in infamy", referring to President Franklin Roosevelt's statement about the Pearl Harbor attack.

Amid ballot counting in the 2020 election, Kelly filed a lawsuit to stop Pennsylvania from allowing voters to "cure" (fix mistakes on) their ballots. After Biden won Pennsylvania, Kelly filed a suit arguing that all mail-in ballots cast in the state (more than 2.5 million) should be discarded, which would result in flipping the state to Trump, or if that was not possible, that the electors for president should instead be chosen by the legislature. If successful, this suit would have retroactively disenfranchised millions of voters in the Pennsylvania election. On November 28, 2020, the Pennsylvania Supreme Court unanimously rejected Kelly's suit, additionally ruling to "dismiss with prejudice."

In December 2020, Kelly was one of 126 Republican members of the House of Representatives to sign an amicus brief in support of Texas v. Pennsylvania, a lawsuit filed at the United States Supreme Court contesting the results of the 2020 presidential election, in which Biden defeated Trump. The Supreme Court declined to hear the case on the basis that Texas lacked standing under Article III of the Constitution to challenge the results of an election held by another state.

Economy 
In March 2021, all House Republicans including Kelly voted against the American Rescue Plan Act of 2021, a $1.9 trillion coronavirus relief bill.

Healthcare 
On August 1, 2012, Kelly called the HHS mandate of the Patient Protection and Affordable Care Act (Obamacare) - which requires health insurers or employers that provide their employees with health insurance to cover some contraceptive costs in their health insurance plans - an attack on Americans' constitutionally protected religious rights and said that August 1, 2012, would go down in infamy as "the day that religious freedom died".

LGBT rights 
In 2015, Kelly cosponsored a resolution to amend the US constitution to ban same-sex marriage. In 2022, he was one of 157 Republicans to vote against a bill protecting same-sex and interracial marriage.

Awards & Honors 
Kelly has a record of bipartisanship and working across the aisle to pass legislation. In three consecutive Congresses, Kelly landed in the top one-third of most bipartisan members, according to The Lugar Center and Georgetown University's McCourt School of Public Policy.

Kelly is among the leading members of Congress regarding constituent services. From 2018-2020, Kelly and his staff were named finalists for the Congressional Management Foundation's Constituent Service Award.

Personal life 
Kelly lives in Butler, Pennsylvania, with his wife Victoria. They have four children and ten grandchildren. He is the brother-in-law of retired Congressman Phil Roe of Tennessee's 1st congressional district. He is Catholic. In 2019, he said that, as a person of Irish and Anglo-Saxon descent, he considers himself a person of color—a term often used to describe people of nonwhite backgrounds.

References

External links
 Congressman Mike Kelly official U.S. House website
 Mike Kelly for Congress
 
 
 

|-

|-

1948 births
21st-century American politicians
American automobile salespeople
American Roman Catholics
Catholics from Pennsylvania
Businesspeople from Pennsylvania
Living people
Pennsylvania city council members
People from Butler, Pennsylvania
Republican Party members of the United States House of Representatives from Pennsylvania
School board members in Pennsylvania
American conspiracy theorists